Numéro# is a French Canadian electropop duo consisting of Jérôme Rocipon and Pierre Crube.

Biography
Jérôme Rocipon is a native of Bordeaux, France and played as a guitarist in various rock groups in the country with additional interests in hip hop.  He started to correspond with Pierre Crube, a composer of experimental electronic music from Montreal in the primarily Francophone province of Quebec in Canada.  The two exchanged their compositions on the Internet.  From this exchange, the project Numéro# was born, and their compositions were put online on MySpace.

Their debut album, L'Idéologie des stars, was released in 2006 on the Montreal-based independent label Saboteur Musique. The duo performed heavily, including notably opening up for TTC.  A single, "Hit pop", started to receive play on commercial top 40 radio, which is unusual for an independent group.

The band's second single, "Chewing-Gum Fraise", is their biggest hit in Canada, mostly Quebec. The song's video was the #2 video of the year on MusiquePlus.

Collaborations
The rap group Omnikrom appeared on the album L'Idéologie des stars in one of the versions of their single "Chewing-gum fraise".  In the spring of 2007, Numéro# returned the favour and collaborated with Omnikrom on their first album, Trop Banane!, appearing on the tracks "Ghetto Hype" and "Bouger Bouger".

Discography

Albums
L'Idéologie des stars (Saboteur Musique, 2006)
Sport de combat (2009)

Singles
"Hit-pop" (2007)
"Chewing-gum fraise" (featuring Omnikrom) (2007)
"J'aime la bourgeoisie" (2008)
"Tout est parfait" (2009)
"Juste pour le flirt" (featuring Teki Latex) (2010)

Canadian electronic music groups
Electronic music duos
French electronic music groups
Musical groups established in 2006
2006 establishments in France
2006 establishments in Quebec